Mohammad Karim (1950/1951 – 4 April 2022), also known as "Little Karim", was a Pakistani high-altitude porter-turned  mountain climber. He climbed Gasherbrum II without supplementary oxygen.

Biography 
Karim was born in Hushe Valley of District Ghanche, Gilgit-Baltistan. He reached Skardu city in 1976 from his home town, Hushe Valley, to try his luck at becoming a high-altitude porter. He was rejected by a team looking at his stature believing that he would not be able to carry 25 kg weight up to the base camp of K-2. Though he was in his teens, he looked like a 10-year-old boy due to his appearance.

Losing hope, Karim was about to leave, when a Spanish team ran out of porters and took him along. In the same trip he managed to summit a 7000-meter peak.
The Spanish team members were so impressed by him that they wrote a book about the life of little Karim and also made a film in the year 2000. The film was aired in Spanish cinema.

Little Karim died on 4 April 2022.

Documentaries on Karim 
In 1985, Laurent Chevallier, a French documentary filmmaker, made a documentary on Karim. In 1997, the same person made a documentary on him, this time, titled Mr Karim. He was again filmed for the third time by the same person sometime later.

References 

1950s births
2022 deaths
Deaths from liver cancer
Deaths from cancer in Pakistan
Pakistani mountain climbers
People from Gilgit-Baltistan
Balti people